InkML is an XML-based markup language to describe "ink" data input with an electronic pen or stylus.  The recommended specification was published by the World Wide Web Consortium (W3C) in September 2011.

It is part of the W3C Multimodal Interaction Activity initiative.

Software 

InkML Toolkit (InkMLTk) is targeted at providing a suite of tools for working with InkML documents. 
The toolkit includes the following libraries and tools,
 InkML processor libraries implementing the W3C InkML specification
 Converters library and tools (to and from other ink and image formats)
 InkML viewers as browser plug-ins, and
 InkML applications such as a graphical editor.

This project is released on SourceForge as an open source contribution from HP Labs, India.

See also
Ink Serialized Format
Tablet computer

External links
W3C InkML Home
InkML Specification
InkML Toolkit - open source contribution from HP Labs, India

World Wide Web Consortium standards
Open formats
HP software